The 1975 Furman Paladins football team was an American football team that represented Furman University as a member of the Southern Conference (SoCon) during the 1975 NCAA Division I football season. In their third season under head coach Art Baker, Furman compiled a 5–5–1 record, with a mark of 2–4 in conference play, placing sixth in the SoCon.

Schedule

References

Furman
Furman Paladins football seasons
Furman Paladins football